

Prunus cerasifera is a species of plum known by the common names cherry plum and myrobalan plum. It is native to Southeast Europe and Western Asia, and is naturalised in the British Isles and scattered locations in North America. Also naturalized in parts of SE Australia where it is considered to be a mildly invasive weed of bushland near urban centers.

Description
It is one of the first European trees to flower in spring, often starting in mid-February before the leaves have opened. The fruit is an edible drupe, 2–3 cm in diameter, ripening to yellow or red from early July to mid-September. They are self-fertile but can also be pollinated by other Prunus varieties such as the Victoria plum. The plant propagates by seed or by suckering, and is often used as the rootstock for other Prunus species and cultivars.

Cultivation
The cherry plum is a popular ornamental tree for garden and landscaping use, grown for its very early flowering. Numerous cultivars have been developed, many of them selected for purple foliage, such as P cerasifera var pissardii (Carrière) L.H. Bailey (P. 'Atropurpurea'). The cultivar 'Nigra' with black foliage and pink flowers, has gained the Royal Horticultural Society's Award of Garden Merit. Prunus × cistena (purple leaf sand cherry), a hybrid of Prunus cerasifera and Prunus pumila, the sand cherry, also won the Award of Garden Merit. 
 These purple-foliage forms (often called 'purple-leaf plum'), also have dark purple fruit, which make an attractive, intensely coloured jam. They can have white or pink flowers.  The cultivar 'Thundercloud' has bright red foliage which darkens purple. Others, such as 'Lindsayae', have green foliage. Some kinds of purple-leaf plums are used for bonsai and other forms of living sculpture.

Cultivated cherry plums can have fruits, foliage, and flowers in any of several colours. Some varieties have sweet fruits that can be eaten fresh, while others are sour and better for making jam. Cherry plums are a key ingredient in Georgian cuisine where they are used to produce tkemali sauce, as well as a number of popular dishes, such as kharcho soup and chakapuli stew. It is a popular tree in Romania where its fruits are used for souring soups when immature, for eating raw when ripened, and for making moonshine  when overripe because of their high sugar content.

Gallery

See also 

 List of plum dishes

Notes

References

External links 

 
 
 
 Prunus cerasifera - information, genetic conservation units and related resources. European Forest Genetic Resources Programme (EUFORGEN)

cerasifera
Ornamental trees
Flora of Europe
Flora of Asia
Plants described in 1754
Fruit trees
Sour fruits
Taxa named by Jakob Friedrich Ehrhart